Margit Schumann (14 September 1952 – 11 April 2017) was an East German luger who competed during the 1970s and early 1980s. Competing in three Winter Olympics, she won two medals in the women's singles event with a gold in 1976 and a bronze in 1972.

Schumann also won four consecutive gold medals at the FIL World Luge Championships (1973–75, 1977). Her number of championships would not be matched until Sylke Otto (also German) won it in 2000, 2001, 2003, and 2005.

At the FIL European Luge Championships, Schumann won five medals with three golds (1973–1975), one silver (1977), and one bronze (1979).

A sixth place at the 1980 Winter Olympics at Lake Placid concluded her career as a competitor, and she moved on to study Sports Sciences at the Academy for Physical Culture in Leipzig, in order to become a specialist trainer in sports sledding. She then began work at Oberhof coaching juniors before she became an East German team selector. After this she took a civilian job with the army. Following reunification in 1990 she took a position as a Personnel specialist with the military Sports Promotion group at Oberhof. Later the Military commissariat posted her to their Psychological Section at Zella-Mehlis.

In 2004, Schumann was among the first three inductees into the International Luge Federation (FIL) Hall of Fame, along with Klaus Bonsack and Paul Hildgartner.

Schumann died on 11 April 2017 in Oberhof at the age of 64.

References

External links
FIL-Luge.org January 7, 2004 Hall of Fame induction.
Fuzilogik Sports - Winter Olympic results - Women's luge.
Hickoksports.com results on Olympic champions in luge and skeleton.
Hickok sports information on World champions in luge and skeleton.
List of European luge champions 
SportQuick.com information on World champions in luge 

1952 births
2017 deaths
People from Waltershausen
People from Bezirk Erfurt
German female lugers
Sportspeople from Thuringia
Olympic lugers of East Germany
Lugers at the 1972 Winter Olympics
Lugers at the 1976 Winter Olympics
Lugers at the 1980 Winter Olympics
Olympic medalists in luge
Olympic gold medalists for East Germany
Olympic bronze medalists for East Germany
Medalists at the 1976 Winter Olympics
Medalists at the 1972 Winter Olympics
Recipients of the Patriotic Order of Merit in gold
20th-century German women